Staunton Township may refer to one of the following places:

In Canada

Staunton Township, Cochrane District, Ontario (geographic / historical)

In the United States

Staunton Township, Macoupin County, Illinois
Staunton Township, Miami County, Ohio

See also

Staunton (disambiguation)

Township name disambiguation pages